Dan Katchongva (January 1, 1860 (Old Oraibi) - February 22, 1972 (Hotevilla)) was a Hopi Native American traditional leader. Son of Yukiuma, keeper of the Fire Clan tablets, who founded Hotevilla in 1906. He is one of four Hopis (including Thomas Banyacya, David Monongye, and Dan Evehema) who decided or were appointed to reveal Hopi traditional wisdom and teachings, including the Hopi prophecies for the future, to the general public in 1946, after the use of the first two nuclear weapons on Japan. Katchongva was the eldest of the group of four knowledgeable Hopis, and the first to die. Kachongva was a member of the Sun Clan.

The transcript of a talk by Katchongva recorded January 29, 1970 was published in the traditional Hopi newsletter Techqua Ikachi in 1972, and has been widely republished in books, journals, and on the Internet.

According to the East West Journal (July 15, 1975) publication of this message, "Dan Katchongva, the Sun Clan leader in Hotevilla village, was told by his father, Yukiuma, that he would live to see the beginning of Purification Day. Dan died in 1972."

Katchongva's talk were also published as a booklet called "Hopi: A Message for All People" (White Roots of Peace, 1975).

References

External links 
 "Teachings, History & Prophecy", originally published in 1972 by Techqua Ikachi, from a talk recorded January 29, 1970.
 Obituary in Arizona Champion/Coconino Sun (Flagstaff, Arizona) newspaper
 Mentioned in excerpt from Frank Waters "Book of the Hopi"
 Around the sacred fire: a native religious activism in the Red Power era : a narrative map of the Indian Ecumenical Conference by James Treat

Hopi people
Religious figures of the indigenous peoples of North America
Native American activists
Indigenous peoples of North America articles needing expert attention
1860 births
1972 deaths
20th-century Native Americans